The restoration of Tahmasp II to the Safavid throne took place in the latter part of 1729 by a series of battles fought between Nader, Tahmasp's commander-in-chief and Ashraf Hotaki. Despite nominally bringing Tahmasp to the seat of power, true authority still rested with Nader who had ever since the debacle in northern Khorasan managed to seize Tahmasp II as his vassal.  Hotak was defeated. As for Afghan rule, the Ghilzai Afghans were ejected from the Iranian Plateau permanently and in the following years were re-annexed by Nader whence they were once again absorbed into the Persian empire. The Safavids under Tahmsap II were restored.

Overview of the campaign

Battle of Mihmandoost 

Having delayed a confrontation with Tahmasp long enough, Ashraf found himself threatened by the pretender to the Safavid throne and his young general Nader. Hearing of their expedition against the Abdali of Herat Ashraf decided to march on the capital of Khorasan and capture Mashad before Nader could return from the east. However Nader was back in Mashad well before Ashraf had a chance of invading Khorasan.
Marching towards Damghan Nader and Ashraf clashed near the village of Mihmandoost where despite being heavily outnumbered the Persians gave the Afghans a terribly bloody lesson in modern warfare and crushed Ashraf's army forcing him to retire towards Semnan.

Ambush at Khwar pass 

Ashraf retreated west where he set up a well thought out ambush in the Khwar pass where he hoped the Persians, flushed with their recent triumph, would be surprised and dealt a heavy blow. Nader upon discovering the ambush encircled and then completely destroyed it with whatever remnants fleeing towards Isfahan.

Battle of Murche-Khort 

Requesting urgent support from the Ottoman Empire Ashraf sought to counter the Persian army's thrust towards Isfahan. The Ottomans keen to hold Ashraf in power instead of seeing a resurgent Persia on their eastern frontier were all too eager to help with both guns and artillerymen. At the battle of Murche-Khort the Afghans were yet again decisively defeated forcing Ashraf to flee south.

Liberation of Isfahan 

Nader liberated Isfahan and soon after received Tahmasp II outside the main city gates where the Shah expressed his gratitude to Nader. The city had been devastated by the Afghans leaving very little in terms of riches for when Nader arrived. Tahmasp famously weeped when he saw what had befallen the capital. The city was greatly reduced both in terms of population and in terms of wealth. The people took vengeance on those Afghans who were found hiding throughout the city.

End of Afghan rule in Persia 

Nader set out from Isfahan heading towards Shiraz where Ashraf was busy raking together what he could with the support of some of the local Arab tribes. At this juncture there was no realistic hope for a revival of Afghan fortunes and near Zarghan the Persian engaged and decimated the last army Ashraf commanded, with historical sources disagreeing on his exact fate in the aftermath of the battle.

See also 
Battle of Damghan (1729)
Battle of Khwar Pass
Battle of Murche-Khort
Battle of Zarghan

References

1729 in Iran
Wars involving Iran
Wars involving Safavid Iran